Irene Koumarianou (1930/1931 – 25 January 2013) was a Greek actress whose career began in 1951.

Biography
Koumarianou was born in Galatsi, Athens. She studied at the Greek Conservatory and starred in several plays, mainly at the National Theatre, which included several ancient tragedies, mainly by Epidaurus. She co-starred, with Alice Vougiouklaki, Jenny Karezi, Rena Vlachopoulou and others, during her career. Her film credits included History of Life, Girls on kissing (1965), Tears for Electra (1966), Too late for tears, Captain jack baton (1968), The fairy and the lad (1969), The aristocrat and the Tramp, I pity the stature (1970), The rascal, The efoplistina (1971), Mary of Silence, The constellation of the virgin (1973). 

On television she appeared in series such as Anastasia (1994), The Prince (1996), "Betrayal" (1996), San sister (ET1 – 1998), Alma libre "(2001) and I love-I love and in 2004 had a small role in George Savvatogennimenes Kapoutzidis. the big success came in 2006 with the series "Sto Para Pente".

Koumarianou died on 25 January 2013, aged 82, from heart disease.

Filmography
 Big Streets (1953)
 Dollars and Dreams (1956)
 Girls for Kissing (1964)
 History of Life (1965) .... Euterpe
 Block (1965)
 Tears for Elektra (1966)
 The MPs (1966) ... Lucia
 Stephanie (1966)
 Something Lads Tired (1967)
 Groom from London (1967)
 Two Feet in One Shoe (1967)
 Captain Jack Baton (1968) ... mother
 The Brightest Bouzouki (1968) ... aunt
 Too Late for Tears (1968)
 The Fairy and the Lad (1969) .... mother Manousou
 The Creature (1969) ... patroness
 Pity the Height You (1970) .... nightclub patron
 The Giakoumis a Romeikos heart (1970) ... neighbor
 The Trickster (1971) .... Excellent Varma
 The Daughter of the Sun (1971)
 The Efoplistina (1971)
 Erotic Agreement (1972)
 The Brave Die Twice (1973)
 Mary of Silence (1973)
 Iphigenia (1977)
 Anyone with Madness (1980)
 Crazy and All Greece (1983)
 Sudden Love (1984)
 Quiet Days of August (1991)
 Whoa! (2005) .... Adriana grandmother
 Sto Para Pente (2006) .... Sophie
 Life in the Forum (2009)
 The Other Half (2011)

References

External links

1930s births
2013 deaths
Date of birth unknown
Greek film actresses
Greek stage actresses
Actresses from Athens